Mohammad Momeni (born 23 December 1972) is a retired Iranian professional footballer who played during most of his career for Saipa.

Club career
Momeni was the Iranian top division's top scorer with 19 goals during the 1995–96 season. He had a brief spell with Erzurumspor in the Turkish Super Lig.

International career
Momeni made two appearances for the full Iran national football team, both of them in friendly matches against Turkmenistan on 26 and 28 April 1996.

References

External links
 

1972 births
Living people
People from Sistan and Baluchistan Province
Iranian footballers
Iran international footballers
Payam Mashhad players
Esteghlal F.C. players
Erzurumspor footballers
Saipa F.C. players
Rah Ahan players
Homa F.C. players
Azadegan League players
Süper Lig players
Persian Gulf Pro League players
Iranian expatriate sportspeople in Turkey
Expatriate footballers in Turkey
Iranian expatriate footballers
Association football forwards